The pleasing poison frog (Ameerega bassleri) is a species of frog in the family Dendrobatidae endemic to Peru. The specific name bassleri honors Harvey Bassler, an American geologist and paleontologist.

Distribution and habitat
The species is found in lowland and montane tropical moist forests, in both pristine and slightly degraded habitat, in the Amazon drainage of Peru at elevations of 270–1,200 m.

Conservation
Although it can be extremely common in places, the pleasing poison frog is currently classified as Vulnerable by the IUCN due to ongoing habitat loss, mostly caused by farming and ranching.

References

Ameerega
Amphibians of Peru
Endemic fauna of Peru
Amphibians described in 1941
Taxonomy articles created by Polbot